Lochlyn Munro (born February 12, 1966) is a Canadian actor. His most notable film roles include A Night at the Roxbury (1998), Scary Movie (2000), Freddy vs. Jason (2003), White Chicks (2004), The Predator (2018) and Cosmic Sin (2021). For television, he is perhaps best known for his roles in the Canadian series Northwood, supernatural drama Charmed, and teen drama Riverdale.

Life and career 

Munro has starred in two Moment of Truth movies: Stand Against Fear, as a high-school jock who uses his popularity for all the wrong reasons, and Abduction of Innocence, as the boyfriend-turned-kidnapper of a teenage lumber heiress. In 1999, Munro played the recurring role of Jack Sheridan during the second season of Charmed. He has also appeared on Without A Trace, CSI, CSI: Miami and CSI: NY playing three different characters. He appeared as Peter Musevini, a time traveling patriarch of a genetically-enhanced Nietzschean race, in "Pride Before the Fall", the 100th episode of Andromeda.

He has collaborated multiple times with the Wayans Family, starring in 4 of their films (Scary Movie, White Chicks, Little Man, and Dance Flick).

In 2017, Munro began playing the recurring role of Hal Cooper on The CW teen drama Riverdale.

He currently splits his time between Vancouver and Los Angeles.

Filmography

Film

Television

Television films

References

External links 

1966 births
Living people
Male actors from British Columbia
Canadian male film actors
Canadian male television actors
Canadian male voice actors
Cariboo people
20th-century Canadian male actors
Canadian expatriate male actors in the United States